Gordon Bennett Dukes (December 23, 1888 – January 27, 1966) was an American pole vaulter. He competed at the 1912 Summer Olympics and finished eighth. Dukes won the AAU championship in 1911 and placed second in 1912.

References

1888 births
1966 deaths
American male pole vaulters
Olympic track and field athletes of the United States
Athletes (track and field) at the 1912 Summer Olympics
Date of death missing
19th-century American people
20th-century American people